Army Group D (Heeresgruppe D) was a German Army Group which saw action during World War II.

Army Group D was formed on 26 October 1940 in France, its initial cadre coming from the disbanded Army Group C.

On 15 April 1941, the status of Army Group D was upgraded. From that date on, the commander of Army Group D was also to be considered Oberbefehlshaber West (or OB WEST – the Commander in Chief for the Western Theatre). As a result of this, Army Group D is sometimes incorrectly referred to as Army Group West.

Commanders

Orders of battle
May 1941
 Seventh Army
 First Army
 Fifteenth Army
 Commander of all German troops of Occupation in the Netherlands

May 1944
 Army Group G
 Army Group B
 Panzer Group West
 First Fallschirm Army

December 1944
 Army Group G
 Army Group B
 Army Group H
 Sixth SS Panzer Army

References

D
Military units and formations established in 1940
Military units and formations disestablished in 1945